Anna Benaki-Psarouda (born 12 December 1934) is a Greek lawyer, New Democracy politician and academician.

She was born in Exarcheia, Athens, and obtained her PhD from the University of Bonn. She joined the Athens Bar Association and taught law. In 1981 she entered into politics and in the 1990s became culture minister then Minister of Justice. From 2004 to 2007 she served as Speaker of the Hellenic Parliament. She is the first ever woman to hold that office.

In 2010 she was elected Member of the Academy of Athens. On 7 December 2018 she was elected to serve as Vice-President of the Academy of Athens for the year 2019, and President for the year 2020, succeeding Stephanos Imellos in both offices.

References

External links
  Official Website

1934 births
Members of the Academy of Athens (modern)
Politicians from Athens
Greek women lawyers
Greek MPs 2007–2009
New Democracy (Greece) politicians
Speakers of the Hellenic Parliament
Culture ministers of Greece
Justice ministers of Greece
Academic staff of the National and Kapodistrian University of Athens
University of Bonn alumni
Women government ministers of Greece
Living people
21st-century Greek women politicians
Female justice ministers
20th-century Greek lawyers
20th-century women lawyers
Greek expatriates in Germany